Agide is an Italian male given name, related to the ancient Greek name Agis.

Notable people
Notable people with this name include:
 Agide Jacchia, Italian orchestral director
 Agide Simonazzi, Italian sprinter

Other
 Agide (Alfieri), play by Vittorio Alfieri

See also 
 Agis (disambiguation)